Thomas Darcy, 1st Baron Darcy of Chiche KG (4 December 1506 – 28 June 1558) was an English courtier during the reign of Edward VI. He served as Vice-Chamberlain of the Household and Captain of the Yeomen of the Guard between 1550 and 1551 before his appointment as Lord Chamberlain of the Household. He was placed under house arrest for his support of Lady Jane Grey as Edward's successor.

Early and family life
Thomas Darcy, born in 1506, was the only son and heir of Roger Darcy (d. 30 September 1508) by Elizabeth Wentworth, the daughter of Sir Henry Wentworth, and aunt of Queen Jane Seymour. 

After the death of Roger Darcy, Elizabeth (née Wentworth) married secondly, as his second wife, Sir Thomas Wyndham (d. 1522) of Felbrigg, Norfolk, by whom she was the mother of Sir Thomas Wyndham. She married thirdly, as his third wife, John Bourchier, 1st Earl of Bath.

After his father's death, Thomas Darcy became the ward of Sir John Raynsford. He married Raynsford's daughter Audrey in 1521. She died childless in 1527 and he later married Elizabeth, daughter of John de Vere, 15th Earl of Oxford and Elizabeth Trussell. They had five or eight children, including John, who succeeded as 2nd Baron Darcy of Chiche. He married Frances, daughter of Richard Rich, 1st Baron Rich, and they had issue, including Thomas, 3rd Baron and 1st Earl Rivers.

Political career

He was knighted in 1532, and sat in parliament for Essex in 1539, 1545 and 1547, and possibly in 1536. 

Following the death of the Earl of Oxford in 1540, he held offices usually held by the de Veres: Steward of St. Osyth's, Keeper of Colchester Castle and Keeper of Tendring Hundred. His position in court was assisted though his relations with the de Veres and his cousin, Edward Seymour, 1st Duke of Somerset. 

He was appointed a Carver of the King's Table in 1540, a Gentleman of the Privy Chamber by 1544, and a Principal Gentleman of the Privy Chamber in 1549. He was sworn of the Privy Council on 24 January 1550, and on 2 February he was appointed Vice-Chamberlain of the Household and Captain of the Yeomen of the Guard. 

On 5 April 1551, he was created Baron Darcy of Chiche to serve as Lord Chamberlain of the Household, and in this role, he led a commission to reform the revenue courts. He was elected to the Order of the Garter on 6 October.

Following the attainder and execution for treason of Sir Nicholas Carew in 1539, Darcy was granted the principal Carew estate at Beddington, which he later sold back to Carew's heirs.

He was one of the signatories to the letters patent enabling Lady Jane Grey to succeed Edward VI, and this support led to his house arrest by Mary I. He was pardoned, but lost his offices and council membership.

He died on 28 June 1558 at Wivenhoe in Essex and was buried at St Osyth's Priory. He was succeeded by his eldest son John as 2nd Baron Darcy of Chiche.

Notes

References

External links
  Darcy, Sir Thomas (1506-58), of Danbury, Wivenhoe and St. Osyth (Chiche), Essex A biography at The History of Parliament
 Thomas Darcy, Baron Darcy of Chiche Family tree

1506 births
1558 deaths
Members of the Privy Council of England
Knights Bachelor
Knights of the Garter
Barons in the Peerage of England
Peers of England created by Edward VI
English MPs 1539–1540
English MPs 1545–1547
English MPs 1547–1552
16th-century English nobility
Gentlemen of the Privy Chamber
Masters of the Buckhounds
Burials in Essex